The arrondissement of Saint-Germain-en-Laye is an arrondissement of France in the Yvelines department in the Île-de-France region. It has 44 communes.

Composition

The communes of the arrondissement of Saint-Germain-en-Laye, and their INSEE codes, are:

 Achères (78005)
 Aigremont (78007)
 Les Alluets-le-Roi (78010)
 Andelu (78013)
 Andrésy (78015)
 Bazemont (78049)
 Carrières-sous-Poissy (78123)
 Carrières-sur-Seine (78124)
 Chambourcy (78133)
 Chanteloup-les-Vignes (78138)
 Chatou (78146)
 Chavenay (78152)
 Conflans-Sainte-Honorine (78172)
 Crespières (78189)
 Croissy-sur-Seine (78190)
 Davron (78196)
 L'Étang-la-Ville (78224)
 Feucherolles (78233)
 Herbeville (78305)
 Houilles (78311)
 Louveciennes (78350)
 Maisons-Laffitte (78358)
 Mareil-Marly (78367)
 Mareil-sur-Mauldre (78368)
 Marly-le-Roi (78372)
 Maule (78380)
 Maurecourt (78382)
 Médan (78384)
 Le Mesnil-le-Roi (78396)
 Montainville (78415)
 Montesson (78418)
 Morainvilliers (78431)
 Orgeval (78466)
 Le Pecq (78481)
 Poissy (78498)
 Le Port-Marly (78502)
 Saint-Germain-en-Laye (78551)
 Saint-Nom-la-Bretèche (78571)
 Sartrouville (78586)
 Triel-sur-Seine (78624)
 Verneuil-sur-Seine (78642)
 Vernouillet (78643)
 Le Vésinet (78650)
 Villennes-sur-Seine (78672)

History

The arrondissement of Saint-Germain-en-Laye was created in 1962 as part of the department Seine-et-Oise. In 1968 it became part of the new department Yvelines. At the January 2017 reorganisation of the arrondissements of Seine-et-Marne, it received six communes from the arrondissement of Mantes-la-Jolie, and it lost six communes to the arrondissement of Versailles.

As a result of the reorganisation of the cantons of France which came into effect in 2015, the borders of the cantons are no longer related to the borders of the arrondissements. The cantons of the arrondissement of Saint-Germain-en-Laye were, as of January 2015:

 Andrésy
 La Celle-Saint-Cloud
 Chatou
 Conflans-Sainte-Honorine
 Houilles
 Maisons-Laffitte
 Marly-le-Roi
 Le Pecq
 Poissy-Nord
 Poissy-Sud
 Saint-Germain-en-Laye-Nord
 Saint-Germain-en-Laye-Sud
 Saint-Nom-la-Bretèche
 Sartrouville
 Triel-sur-Seine
 Le Vésinet

References

Saint-Germain-en-Laye